The Mysterious Cities of Gold: Secret Paths is a game developed by Neko Entertainment and published by Ynnis Interactive, relating the events told in the 2012 television series The Mysterious Cities of Gold.

The game is available digitally on PC, iOS, Android, Wii U and Nintendo 3DS, and in retail in some European countries on PC and Nintendo 3DS.

Gameplay 
The game is composed of puzzles and infiltration sequences. The player must take advantage of the characters' skills: Esteban (unlocking mechanisms with the power of the sun), Zia (slipping into narrow spaces) and Tao (decrypting Mu language and sending Pichu retrieving distant objects).

In the iOS and Android mobile versions, the game is presented in episodic format, with each episode being sold separately after the first five as in-app purchases.

Story 
Six months after discovering the first golden city in Central America, and back to Barcelona, Esteban, Zia and Tao are looking for the missing six cities. Aboard their Great Condor and accompanied by Pichu, Mendoza, Pedro and Sancho, they embark to Asia, specifically to China and Tibet. They are followed by Zares, a mysterious stranger in the pay of the King of Spain, who is determined to prevent the children from accomplishing their quest.

Financing 
In September 2013, Ynnis Interactive completed a crowdfunding campaign on Kickstarter, earning $46,680 (on a $30,000 goal) in one month, in order to fund an English dubbing, and subtitling of the game in most European languages and Arabic. On November 7, The Mysterious Cities of Gold: Secret Paths received public subsidies in the amount of €120,000 (or $157,000) from CNC, as a "Help to the creation of intellectual property".

Reception 
Critics' responses were mixed. Metacritic ascribes an average of 60/100 on a total of seven reviews, indicating mixed or average reviews. The major French site Jeuxvideo.com talks about "relatively interesting puzzles" but concludes "the whole thing lacks fun".

References

External links
 

2013 video games
Action-adventure games
Android (operating system) games
IOS games
Kickstarter-funded video games
Nintendo 3DS eShop games
Puzzle video games
Video games based on television series
Video games developed in France
Wii U eShop games
Windows games
The Mysterious Cities of Gold
Neko Entertainment games